Jonathan Paul Dunn (born December 12, 1981 in Norfolk, Virginia) is a former American football offensive tackle. He was drafted by the Cleveland Browns in the seventh round of the 2005 NFL Draft. He played college football at Virginia Tech.

Dunn has also been a member of the New York Giants and Detroit Lions.

Early years
Dunn attended Tallwood High School in Virginia Beach, Virginia. He earned All-America honors from SuperPrep, Prep Star and Tom Lemming's Prep Football Report as a senior and was rated the No. 35 offensive line prospect in the nation by SuperPrep and the ninth-best player in Virginia. Listed as the best offensive lineman in the state and the seventh-best overall prospect in Virginia by The Roanoke Times. Lettered three seasons in football and saw most of his action as an offensive tackle. Also received some playing time at defensive tackle and as a long snapper. Earned all-district honors his junior and senior seasons and was named all-eastern region in his final year. Had eight tackles and two sacks in limited defensive duty in 1999.

College career
Dunn worked at right tackle with the scout team while redshirting in 2000 at Virginia Tech.  He played in ten games as a redshirt freshman in 2001, seeing action on offense in nine of those contests.  He played in every game in 2002, starting seven contests at the right tackle position.  Dunn collected 22 knockdowns and graded 80.3 percent for blocking consistency that campaign.  In 2003, he started all 12 games he played in, missing the Central Florida game.  Dunn would go on to register 23 knockdown blocks and grade 83 percent while participating in 716 plays that year.  As a senior, he earned second-team All-Atlantic Coast Conference honors.  He again lined up at right tackle, making a career-high 34 knockdowns.  Dunn was on the field for 793 plays as a senior and received an 82 percent grade for blocking consistency.

External links
Detroit Lions bio
Virginia Tech Hokies bio

1981 births
Living people
American football offensive tackles
Virginia Tech Hokies football players
Cleveland Browns players
Hamburg Sea Devils players
New York Giants players
Detroit Lions players
Sportspeople from Virginia Beach, Virginia